is a fashion and music event held on April 9, 2016, at Yoyogi National Gymnasium 1st Gymnasium in Tokyo, Japan. The main MCs were Minami Takahashi and Ryōta Yamasato. This is the first job for Minami Takahashi since she left AKB48. The video of the runway show was distributed through Vine.

Models 
 Aya Asahina, Hitomi Arai (Tokyo Girls' Style), Elaiza Ikeda, Miyū Ikeda, Nicole Ishida, IMALU, Arisa Urahama, Manami Enosawa, emma, Miwako Kakei, Mayuko Kawakita, Reina Kizu, Asuka Saitō (Nogizaka46), Rikako Sakata, Yui Sakuma, Arisa Sato, Hinako Sano, Yuki Shikanuma, Yuumi Shida, Mai Shiraishi (Nogizaka46), Karen Takizawa, Rena Takeda, Rie Tachibana, Hazuki Tsuchiya, Reina Triendl, An Nakamura, Nanao, Tomoko Nozaki, Moeka Nozaki, Nanami Hashimoto(Nogizaka46), Mizuho Habu (Keyakizaka46), Miyu Hayashida, Nicole Fujita, Miki Fujimoto, Kumiko Funayama, Hikari Mori, Maggy, Airi Matsui, Sayuri Matsumura (Nogizaka46), Erika Matsumoto, Karin Miyagi, Mai Miyagi, Ayaka Miyoshi, Yōko Melody, Alissa Yagi, Hirona Yamazaki, Nairu Yamamoto, Chisato Yoshiki, Loveli
 Non-no models: Haru Izumi, Niina Endō, Sayaka Okada, Anri Okamoto, Hinako Kinoshita, Akiko Kuji, Mina Sayado, Yua Shinkawa, Yūna Suzuki, Riho Takada, Nanase Nishino (Nogizaka46), Fumika Baba
 Men's Non-no models: Yoshiaki Takahashi, Kōji Moriya, Taichi Kodama, Ryo Narita, Shō Kiyohara, Ryosuke Yamamoto, Keisuke Nakata, Hiroki Suzukawa, Hio Miyazawa, Ryōsuke Miyake, Shūzaburō Hara
 Men's models: Hikaru Ōta, Kento Kanou, Keisuke Kida, Youji Kondō, Tokito, Masaya Nakamura, Shōgo Hama, Issei Makishi

Artists 
 PKCZ, Keyakizaka46, Da-ice, T-Style, Nogizaka46, Cherrsee, Block B, X21, Thinking Dogs, M!LK

Guests 
 Kasumi Arimura, Yo Oizumi, Tetsuko Okuhira, Miori Takimoto, Emi Takei, Masami Nagasawa, Arie Mizusawa, Ryuchell

Brands 
 Bershka, Black Label Crestbridge, Bobon21, Evris, Forever 21, Guild Prime, Heather, Honey Cinnamon, Lip Service, Loco Boutique, Loveless, Me%, Merry Jenny, Murua, Old Navy, Olive des Olive, Redyazel, Samantha Thavasa, Ungrid, Wego

References

External links 
 

Fashion events in Japan
Japanese fashion
Japanese subcultures
2016 awards
April 2016 events in Japan
Events in Tokyo
Annual events in Japan
Semiannual events